Sulod is a Central Philippine language of Panay in the Philippines.

Sulod is spoken in the clustered sitios of Buri, Maranat, Siya, and Takayan along the banks of the Panay River, between Mt. Kudkuran and Mt. Baloy in central Panay.

Below are verses from the first two stanzas of the second part of "Sugidanun I" ('First Narration') of the Sulodnon epic  chanted by Hugan-an and recorded by Dr. F. Landa Jocano. The epic is in the original Sulodnon language.

"Sugidanun I": Pangayaw – 2. Himos

Notes

References

See also 
 Hinilawod

Visayan languages
Aeta languages
Languages of Capiz
Languages of Iloilo